= Frédéric Couderc =

French writer

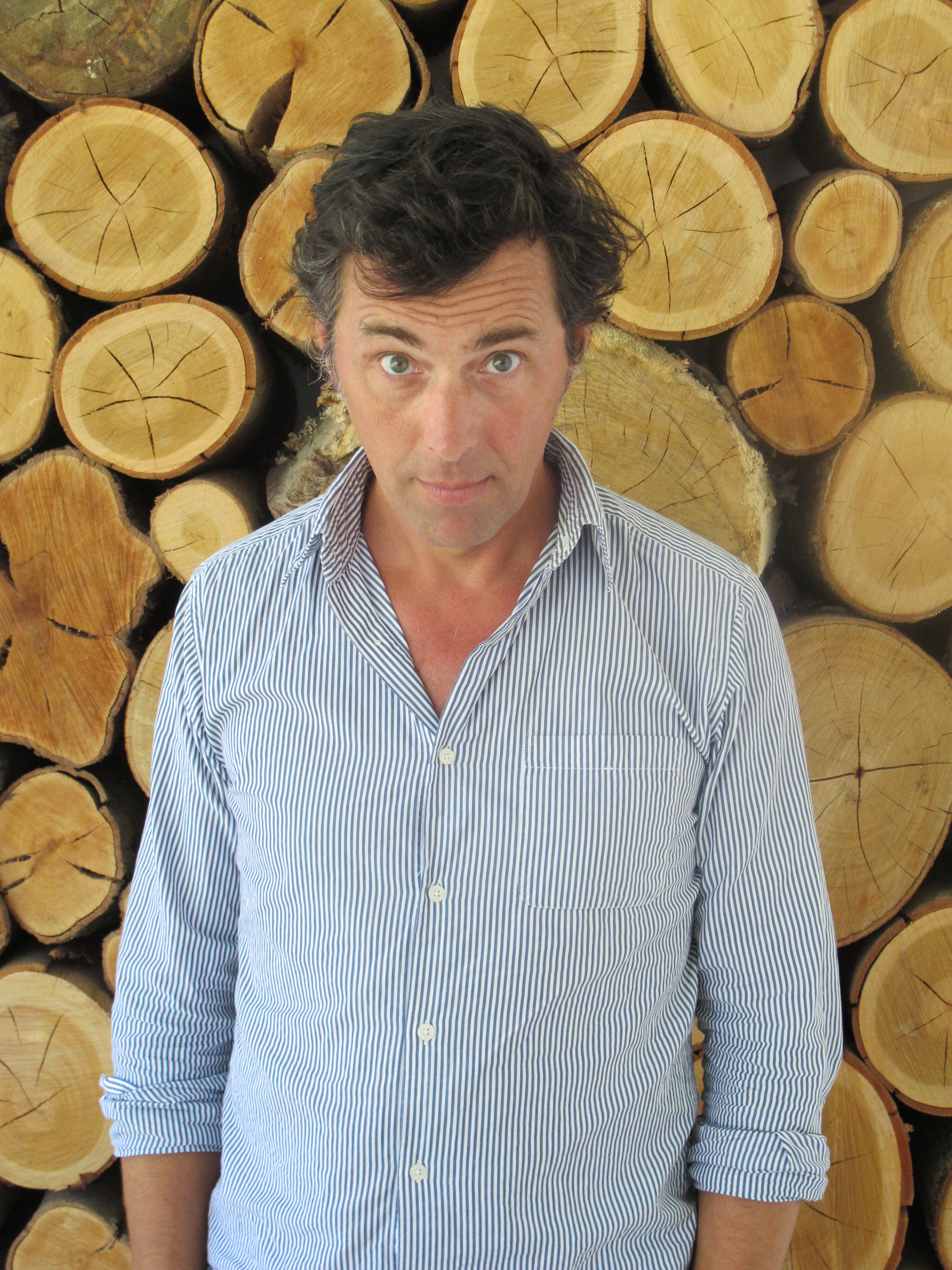
Frédéric Couderc

Frédéric Couderc (born 1965) is a French writer. He is the author of seven novels, including Un été blanc et noir (Prix du roman populaire 2013), Le jour se lève et ce n’est pas le tien (2016) and Aucune pierre ne brise la nuit (2018).

He is known for moving to the countries that are to be the settings of his novels.
